Asterolasia trymalioides, commonly known as alpine star-bush, is a species of erect, sometimes prostrate shrub that is endemic to eastern Australia. It has leathery, narrow elliptical to circular leaves densely covered with star-shaped hairs on the lower surface, and yellow flowers arranged singly in small groups on the ends of branchlets, the back of the petals covered with brown, star-shaped hairs.

Description
The leaves are glossy green on the upper surface and covered with white to brown hairs underneath. The flowers are arranged singly or in small groups on the ends of branchlets, each flower sessile with small leaf-like bracts at their base. Flowering occurs in early summer.

Taxonomy
Asterolasia trymalioides was first formally described in 1854 by Ferdinand von Mueller who published the description in Transactions of the Philosophical Society of Victoria, based on plant material that he collected from the rocky summit of the Cobberas Range.

Distribution and habitat
Alpine star-bush grows in alpine and subalpine grassland, heathland and snow gum (Eucalyptus pauciflora) forest of New South Wales, the Australian Capital Territory and Victoria.

References

trymalioides
Flora of the Australian Capital Territory
Flora of New South Wales
Flora of Victoria (Australia)
Sapindales of Australia
 Plants described in 1854
Taxa named by Ferdinand von Mueller